Dangerous Man Brewing Company is a microbrewery located in the Sheridan neighborhood of Northeast Minneapolis.

Founding
Dangerous Man Brewing Company was founded by Rob Miller, a longtime homebrewer who had been considering opening a brewery for some time.  After changes in Minnesota state law permitted brewery taprooms (and after additional changes in Minneapolis law allowed him to open a brewery across the street from a church) he located his brewery in a turn-of-the-twentieth-century building which was originally a bank. The brewery opened on January 25, 2013.

Business model
Dangerous Man does not distribute their beer.  It is only available in their taproom or sold either in growlers or very limited runs of bottles. In April 2015, Dangerous Man announced they planned to expand into an adjacent building to open a dedicated counter for growler and merchandise sales. The expansion was completed in November 2015, doubling the overall footprint of the brewery and triple their brewing capacity. The brewery hopes to use the added capacity to experiment with slower-fermenting lager styles and to maintain a more reliable supply of growlers and bottles.

References

External links

Beer brewing companies based in Minnesota
Manufacturing companies based in Minneapolis